Nomada bicellularis, is a species of bee, belonging to the family Apidae subfamily Nomadinae. It is endemic to Sri Lanka.

References

External links
 Animal diversity website
 Academia.edu
 Itis.gov

Nomadinae
Insects described in 1908